Catoptria digitellus is a species of moth in the family Crambidae described by Gottlieb August Wilhelm Herrich-Schäffer in 1849. It is found in France and Spain.

References

Moths described in 1849
Crambini
Moths of Europe